Rueso railway station is a railway station located in Rueso Subdistrict, Rueso District, Narathiwat.

Incidents 
 On 18 November 2012, a 100 kg bomb exploded under Local No. 463 Yala-Sungai Kolok. The bomb was planted under the railway tracks at the 1075 km post, between Rueso Railway Station and Ban Salo Bukit Yuaerae Halt. The bombing occurred at around 07:00 am, and caused 1 fatality (military volunteer) and 16 to be seriously injured. Carriage 7 (which was a guard's carriage) was destroyed to the largest extent from the impact of the bomb. The bomb crater was found 200 metres from Carriage 8 (the last carriage) and was 3 metres wide and 1.5 metres deep. Casualties were sent to Narathiwat Rajanagarindra Hospital afterwards.
 On 8 March 2015, a bomb hidden in a motorcycle exploded in front of Rueso Railway Station. The bombing occurred at about 08:00 am, and caused 9 casualties, of which were 3 soldiers and 6 locals. The casualties were sent to Rueso Hospital, Narathwiat Rajanagarindra Hospital and Yala Central Hospital afterwards. The motorcycle used was stolen from a deceased school teacher in Cho-airong District, and the registration plate was stolen from a local in Sukhirin District.
All events were part of the South Thailand Insurgency.

Services 
 Super Express No. 37/38 Bangkok-Sungai Kolok-Bangkok
 Rapid No. 171/172 Bangkok-Sungai Kolok-Bangkok
 Rapid No. 175/176 Hat Yai Junction-Sungai Kolok-Hat Yai Junction
 Local No. 447/448 Surat Thani-Sungai Kolok-Surat Thani
 Local No. 451/452 Nakhon Si Thammarat-Sungai Kolok-Nakhon Si Thammarat
 Local No. 453/454 Yala-Sungai Kolok-Yala
 Local No. 463/464 Phatthalung-Sungai Kolok-Phatthalung

References 

 
 

Railway stations in Thailand